"Music is My Thing" is the 14th single by the Japanese band Dream, and the first single by the band with eight members. The title track was used as the fifth ending theme to the anime Hikaru no Go. The song is a Japanese-language remake of a song originally recorded in English by Belgian artist Samantha Gilles in 1986. The promotional video was released on the Dream Party DVD and its "making of" was released on the dream world limited edition CD+DVD. The single reached number 18 on the weekly Oricon charts and charted for four weeks.

Track list
 Music is My Thing (original mix)
 Music is My Thing (instrumental)

Credits 
 Lyrics: John Sauli
 Music: Yuko Ebine, Fenny De Wulf
 Arrangement: Tatsuhiko Fuyuno

External links
 http://www.oricon.co.jp/music/release/d/499547/1/

2003 singles
Dream (Japanese group) songs
2003 songs
Avex Trax singles